Intelligence Bureau may refer to:

 Intelligence Bureau (India)
 Intelligence Bureau (Pakistan)
 Intelligence agency

See also
Intelligence Bureau for the East, a World War I German organisation
Intelligence agency
National Intelligence Service (disambiguation)
Foreign Intelligence service (disambiguation)
State Intelligence Service (disambiguation)
Federal Intelligence Service (disambiguation)
General Intelligence Directorate (disambiguation)
Directorate of Military Intelligence (disambiguation)